Metabolic water refers to water created inside a living organism through their metabolism, by oxidizing energy-containing substances in their food.  Animal metabolism produces about 107-110 grams of water per 100 grams of fat, 41-42 grams of water per 100 g of protein and 60 grams of water per 100 g of carbohydrate.

Some organisms, especially xerocoles, animals living in the desert, rely exclusively on metabolic water.  Migratory birds must rely exclusively on metabolic water production while making non-stop flights.  Humans, by contrast, obtain only about 8-10% of their water needs through metabolic water production.

In mammals, the water produced from metabolism of protein roughly equals the amount needed to excrete the urea which is a byproduct of the metabolism of protein. Birds, however, excrete uric acid and can have a net gain of water from the metabolism of protein.

References

Metabolism
Water